Olivia Bonamy (born 21 September 1972) is a French actress. She is best known for her appearances in the films Jefferson in Paris, Jacques Audiard's Read My Lips, the thriller Ils and Le ciel, les oiseaux et ta mère.

Biography
She studied art history at university and then took a course in theatre.

Her box office success occurred in the mid-1990s, but she is mostly unknown outside France.

She has a son, Luigi, born on 10 February 2009, with French actor Romain Duris.

Filmography
Le Petit garçon (1995) - Juliette
Jefferson in Paris (1995) - Schoolgirl
Sen de Gitme (1995) - Triyandfilis
L'Échappée belle (1996) - Chloé
Le Ciel, les oiseaux,... et ta mère! (1999) (English title: Boys on the Beach) - Lydie
Voyous voyelles (1999) (English title : Pretty devils) - Léa
Une pour toutes (1999) (English title: One 4 All) - Olivia Colbert
La Captive (2000) (English title: The Captive) - Andrée
Mortels (2000, Short) - La soeur
Sur mes lèvres (2001) (English title: Read My Lips) - Annie
Heureuse (2001, Short) - La virtuelle de 28kg
Filles perdues, cheveux gras (2002) (English title: Hypnotized and Hysterical) - Élodie
Bloody Mallory (2002) - Mallory
Pierre, Paul ou Jacques (2003, Short) - Marie
Mariage mixte (2004) - Lisa Zagury
Célibataires (2006) - Nelly
Ils (2006) - Clémentine
L'âge d'homme... maintenant ou jamais! (2007)
Paris (2008) - Diane
MR 73 (2008) - Justine Maxence
La guerre des miss (2008) - Cécile
Une folle envie (2011) - Rose Abadi
Chez nous c'est trois! (2013) - L'actrice de Baisers fanés
De plus belle (2017) - Manon

Television 
Des enfants dans les arbres (1994, TV Movie) - Nora
Ils n'ont pas 20 ans (1995, TV Movie) - Véronique
Ange Espérandieu (1995, TV Movie) - Fanny
Les Filles du maître de chai (1997, TV Movie) - Juliette
Elle a l'âge de ma fille (1998, TV Movie) - Eugénie
Un père en plus (1998, TV Movie) - Julie
Le Chant de l'homme mort (1998, TV Movie) - Nadia
Une leçon d'amour (1998, TV Movie) - Vanessa
Vertige (2000) - Agathe Rioult
Colomba (2005, TV Movie, adaptation of Joseph Kessel's famous novel) - Colomba

References

External links

1972 births
Living people
People from Saint-Cloud
French film actresses
French television actresses
20th-century French actresses
21st-century French actresses